The Oxford Book of English Madrigals was edited by Philip Ledger, and published in 1978 by the Oxford University Press. It contains words and full music for  some 60 of the madrigals and songs of the English Madrigal School.

When selecting works for this book, Ledger decided to represent the major composers of 16th-century English music such as William Byrd and Thomas Morley with several madrigals, alongside individual works by lesser-known composers. Ledger collaborated with Andrew Parker, a musicologist from King's College, Cambridge, who researched texts to the songs and supplemented the collection with annotations and critical commentary.

In 1978, the choral group Pro Cantione Antiqua released a recording, directed by Ledger, of selected songs from this book.

Contents
The collection contains the following madrigals:

(*) = second parts

See also
Early music of the British Isles
The Triumphs of Oriana Morley's famous collection of 1601

References

Music books
1978 books
Oxford University Press books
Books on English music